Rinne may refer to:

People
Aleksi Rinne (1899–1974), Finnish smallholder and politician
Antti Rinne (b. 1962), Finnish politician
Esa Rinne (b. 1943), Finnish athlete
Fanny Rinne (b. 1980), field hockey midfielder from Germany
Fred Rinne (b. 1955), American visual and performance artist
Friedrich Rinne (1863–1933), German mineralogist, crystallographer and petrographer
Heinrich Adolf Rinne, German otologist
Jacob Rinne (b. 1993), Danish footballer
John Rinne (1923–2010), Orthodox Archbishop of Karelia and All Finland
Joel Rinne (1897–1981), Finnish actor
Jorma Rinne (1936–2003), Finnish discus thrower
Jouni Rinne (b. 1956), retired Finnish ice hockey player
Kris Rinne, technology person and retired Senior VP of network technology at AT&T Labs
Paul Rinne (b. 1889–1946), Estonian chess player
Pekka Rinne (b. 1982), Finnish ice hockey goaltender
Rasmus Rinne (b. 1990), Finnish ice hockey goaltender
Rinne Yoshida, Japanese idol singer
Tapani Rinne (b. 1962), Finnish musician, composer and record producer
Taru Rinne (b. 1968), former Finnish motorcycle racer
Tommi Rinne (1925–1999), Finnish actor
Vilho Rinne (1895–1980), Finnish athlete

Media
Rinne no Lagrange, or Lagrange: The Flower of Rin-ne, a 2012 anime series
Reincarnation (film) (originally Rinne), a 2005 Japanese horror film
Rin-ne, or  Kyōkai no Rinne, a 2009 manga series by Rumiko Takahashi
Rinne Rokudo, its main character

Music
Rinne, a song by Band-Maid from the album Conqueror

Medicine
Rinne test, a screening test for hearing named after Heinrich Adolf Rinne

Rivers
Rinne (river), in Thuringia, Germany